The 1929 TCU Horned Frogs football team represented Texas Christian University (TCU) as a member the Southwest Conference (SWC) during the 1929 college football season. Led by first-year head coach Francis Schmidt, the Horned Frogs compiled and overall record of 9–0–1 overall with a mark of 4–0–1 in conference play, winning the SWC title. TCU played their home games at Clark Field, located on campus in Fort Worth, Texas.

Schedule

References

TCU
TCU Horned Frogs football seasons
Southwest Conference football champion seasons
College football undefeated seasons
TCU Horned Frogs football